Kantanka Automobile, a Ghana based automotive company that designs, manufactures, assembles and sells luxury cars, was established in 1994 by entrepreneur and preacher Kwadwo Safo Kantanka and incorporated as a limited liability into the manufacturing of automotive components and their combination with other parts outsourced from component suppliers to form a complete built unit. In 1998, the first complete built unit (CBU) was manufactured using over 75% of local components, locally manufactured including the engine block. By 2006, the first SUV, the Onantefo, was manufactured. Kwadwo Safo Kantanka is also the founder of the Kristo Asafo (Christ Reformed) Church, a seventh-day movement in Ghana. 

Kantanka vehicles are assembled in Ghana from knock-down kits supplied by a Chinese firm, possibly Foday via Chongqing Big Science & Technology.

Models
The Kantanka range of cars includes both saloon and four-wheel drive vehicles. 

 Kantanka Nkunimdie SUV.
 Kantanka Omama Pickup – Foday Lion
 Kantanka Onantefo 4x4 pickup/SUV – Kantanka Onantefo SUV Foday Explorer 6 
 Otumfuo SUV.
Kantanka K71 small SUV – Brilliance Jinbei S30
Kantanka Amoanimaa
Kantanka Mensah
Kantanka Omama luxury 4x4

Military hardware
Kantanka is alleged to have manufactured military hardware such as armored personnel carriers, tanks, and helicopters. However these devices appear to use fireworks as their primary weapons system. They have also developed combat exoskeletons, which appear to function more as costume props than true weapons systems. 

Kantanka launched an armored vehicle with rangefinder in the 2018 Annual Technology Show at Apostle Safo School of Arts and Sciences.

The Kantanka range of military vehicles includes both air and ground vehicles, as well as infantry equipment.

Models

 Kantanka-ABV, Armored Bullion Vehicle, slated for use as police SUV (Bullet Proof Glass and Armor Plating, based on Kantanka Onantefo)
 Kantanka-KTK2, Helicopter (Mockup only shown) -  Single Crew, Missile Attack Helicopter 
 Kantanka-KTK Car, 4-Wheeled Light Weapons Platform - Crewless Drone Vehicle
 Kantanka-SPG, 4-Wheeled Fighting Artillery, - 3 crew/3 passengers, Main gun and side mounted rocket tubes
 Kantanka-ACCRA APC, 8-Wheeled Fighting Armored Personnel Carrier, (4 meters tall/13 feet), 4 crew, 20 passengers
 Kantanka-GLITZ Walker, Bipedal Mechanized "Chicken Walker"
 Kantanka-Infantry Exoskeleton, Passively Powered via "Gear weight and Hydraulics" (Claimed).

Gallery

References

External links
Official website
News website

Electric vehicle manufacturers of Ghana
Vehicle manufacturing companies established in 1998
Car manufacturers of Ghana
Luxury motor vehicle manufacturers
Ghanaian brands